St. Paul Seminary (St. Paul) is a high school level education institutions for prospective clergy (monks, priests) Roman Catholic in Palembang, Indonesia.

References

Palembang
Education in South Sumatra
Seminaries and theological colleges in Indonesia